Kalkan or Kalakan in Iran may refer to:
 Kalkan, Divandarreh, Kurdistan Province
 Kalkan, Sanandaj, Kurdistan Province
 Kalkan-e Aftabru, Kermanshah Province
 Kalkan-e Nesar, Kermanshah Province